The 1926 Spanish Grand Prix (formally the II Gran Premio de España) was a Grand Prix motor race held at Circuito Lasarte on 25 July 1926. The race was held over 40 laps of a 17.315 km circuit, for a total race distance of 692.6 km. The race was won by Bartolomeo Costantini driving a Bugatti.

The race was held just one week after the 1926 European Grand Prix held on the same circuit. The European Grand Prix was a round of the 1926 AIACR World Championship, so was held to the 1.5 litre formula. The Spanish Grand Prix was held to Formula Libre, and so the Bugatti and Delage factory entries ran their 1925 2-litre cars.

Classification

Sources

Spanish Grand Prix
Spanish Grand Prix
Grand Prix